There are at least 27 named lakes and reservoirs in Craighead County, Arkansas.

Lakes
According to the United States Geological Survey, there are no named lakes in Craighead County.

Reservoirs
 Big Creek Site Four Reservoir, el.  
 Big Creek Site Five Reservoir, el.  
 Big Creek Site Six Reservoir, el.  
 Big Creek Site Seven Reservoir, el.  
 Big Creek Site Eight Reservoir, el.  
 Big Creek Site Nine Reservoir, el.  
 Big Creek Site 10 Reservoir, el.  
 Big Creek Site 11 Reservoir, el.  
 Big Creek Site 13 Reservoir, el.  
 Big Creek Site 14 Reservoir, el.  
 Big Creek Site 15 Reservoir, el.  
 Big Creek Site 16 Reservoir, el.  
 Big Creek Site 17 Reservoir, el.  
 Big Creek Site 18 Reservoir, el.  
 Big Creek Site 19 Reservoir, el.  
 Big Creek Site 20 Reservoir, el.  
 Big Creek Site 21 Reservoir, el.  
 Big Creek Site 22 Reservoir, el.  
 Big Pond, el.  
 Cole Pond, el.  
 Craighead Forest Lake, el.  
 Farmers Lake, el.  
 Guy Parden Pond, el.  
 J L Craft Pond, el.  
 Mary Simpson Pond, el.  
 Poinsett Watershed Site 20 Reservoir, el.  
Ralph Cox Pond, el.

See also

 List of lakes in Arkansas

Notes

Bodies of water of Craighead County, Arkansas
Craighead